Canoeing at the 2013 Southeast Asian Games took place at Ngalike Dam, Naypyidaw, Myanmar between December 9–13.

Medal table

Medalists

Men

Women

Results

Men

C-1 200 m 
Legend
DSQ - Disqualified

All times are Myanmar Standard Time (UTC+06:30)

C-1 500 m
All times are Myanmar Standard Time (UTC+06:30)

C-1 1000 m
All times are Myanmar Standard Time (UTC+06:30)

C-2 200 m
All times are Myanmar Standard Time (UTC+06:30)

C-2 500 m
All times are Myanmar Standard Time (UTC+06:30)

C-2 1000 m
All times are Myanmar Standard Time (UTC+06:30)

K-1 200 m
All times are Myanmar Standard Time (UTC+06:30)

Heats 
 Qualification: 1–2 → Final (QF), 3-4 → Semifinal (QS)

Heat 1

Heat 2

Semifinal 
 Qualification: 1–2 → Final (QF)

Final

K-1 500 m
All times are Myanmar Standard Time (UTC+06:30)

K-4 1000 m
All times are Myanmar Standard Time (UTC+06:30)

Women

K-1 200 m
All times are Myanmar Standard Time (UTC+06:30)

K-1 500 m
All times are Myanmar Standard Time (UTC+06:30)

K-2 200 m
All times are Myanmar Standard Time (UTC+06:30)

K-2 500 m
All times are Myanmar Standard Time (UTC+06:30)

K-4 200 m
All times are Myanmar Standard Time (UTC+06:30)

K-4 500 m
All times are Myanmar Standard Time (UTC+06:30)

K-4 1000 m
All times are Myanmar Standard Time (UTC+06:30)

References

2013 Southeast Asian Games events